The Seventh Ward Railroad, a street trolley line in Syracuse, New York, was established in 1886 and held the city railway franchise rights to East Fayette Street. The route followed Fayette Street from Salina Street to Montgomery Street, Jefferson, Grape, Kennedy, Renwick Avenue with final destination Oakwood Cemetery.

References 

Defunct railroads in Syracuse, New York
Defunct New York (state) railroads
Railway companies established in 1886
Railway companies disestablished in 1890
Interurban railways in New York (state)